The Cascades was an American vocal group best known for the single "Rhythm of the Rain", recorded in 1962, an international hit the following year.

Career
In 1960, the Silver Strands were a group of United States Navy personnel serving on the USS Jason (AR-8) based in San Diego, California. They recruited John Gummoe, who originally acted as manager, then left the Navy to become The Thundernotes. The group's membership consisted of John Claude "John" Gummoe (born August 2, 1938) (lead vocals), Lenny Green (vocal and lead guitar), Dave Wilson (drums and vocal), Dave Stevens (bass), and Art Eastlick (rhythm guitar). Their first and only recording, "Thunder Rhythm" (and "Payday" on the reverse of the 45rpm) was with DelFi Records of Hollywood, owned and managed by Bob Keane. It was a surf-type instrumental. Lenny left soon after to pursue his own goals and the group acquired Eddie Snyder (guitar), David Szabo (keyboards), Dave Stevens (bass) and Dave Wilson (drums).

Influenced by the Beach Boys, the group became more interested in vocal harmony. They recorded demos and signed with Barry De Vorzon at Valiant Records, a subsidiary of Warner Bros., and changed their name to The Cascades – inspired by a nearby box of dishwashing detergent. Their first release, "There's a Reason", became a minor regional hit; in the summer of 1962, they went to Gold Star Studios in Los Angeles to record a song Gummoe wrote in his Navy days on watch during a thunderstorm.  The song was to become "Rhythm of the Rain" and the musicians on the recording included the "Wrecking Crew" - including Hal Blaine on drums, Carol Kaye on bass, and Glen Campbell on guitar - arranged by Perry Botkin Jr. "Rhythm of the Rain" was issued in November 1962. It rose to No. 3 on the U.S. Billboard Hot 100 chart in early 1963, becoming a major hit in over 80 countries. It peaked at No. 5 in the UK Singles Chart. "Rhythm of the Rain" sold over one million copies, and was awarded a gold disc. 
 
The Cascades continued to record, produced an album and several additional singles, including the follow-up "The Last Leaf", but did not match the charm or success of their big hit.  The group continued to receive major radio airplay in their hometown, San Diego. The Cascades' cover version of Bob Lind's "Truly Julie's Blues" received spins on KCBQ and KGB in 1966, and their song "Maybe the Rain Will Fall" fared well on San Diego radio charts in mid-1969.

The group was active, played local San Diego clubs like The Cinnamon Cinder, and at other times, toured widely. In 1967, The Cascades appeared onscreen in the Crown International Pictures teen comedy adventure film, Catalina Caper, which included their version of a song written by Ray Davies of the Kinks, "There's A New World Opening For Me".

Gummoe left the group in 1967 to pursue a solo career and later formed the band Kentucky Express. Keyboardist/vocalist Gabe Lapano took over the lead chores. The group also added Tony Grasso, with Owens and Snyder the remaining original members. Finally, they split in 1975. Snyder later recorded country music under the name Eddie Preston. Gummoe recorded a dance mix of "Rhythm of the Rain" in 1990. The group reformed twice, in 1995 and 2004, touring the US and the Philippines, where they retained a fan following.
A compilation CD of the Cascades' best moments was issued in 1999. That same year, performing rights organization BMI announced the "Top 100 Songs of the Century." to receive airplay on radio or television in the U.S., with "Rhythm of the Rain" at No. 9.

Discography

Albums

Studio albums

Compilation albums

Remix albums

Singles

References

External links
Rhythm of the Rain — John Gummoe & The Cascades
 Interview with Gummoe by Gary James, 2002

Musical groups established in 1960
Musical groups disestablished in 1975
Musical groups from San Diego
Musical quintets
American pop music groups
Arwin Records artists
RCA Victor artists
Smash Records artists
Liberty Records artists
Warner Records artists
1960 establishments in California